Walter Rojas (born 15 January 1971 in Argentina) is an Argentinean retired footballer.

References

Argentine footballers
Living people
Association football wingers
1971 births
Association football midfielders
Talleres de Remedios de Escalada footballers
Huracán Buceo players
Deportivo Laferrere footballers